Ursula O'Leary (Birmingham, 10 March 1926 – 17 May 1993)  was an English stage, radio and television actress She graduated in stage management from  the Royal Academy of Dramatic Arts (RADA) in 1948  and her stage performances were broadcast live nationwide; on radio she played siren art teacher Jane Petrie in The Archers.

Stage management
In 1948, while still a student, she starred as Viola/Cesario in Twelfth Night directed by Robert Atkins, sharing the stage with Robert Shaw, Peter Sallis and Patricia Neal. Some scenes were adapted for BBC Television at a time when programmes were transmitted live from the studio and unarchived other than still photography. Michael Barry, Head of Drama at BBC Television, adapted the performance for broadcast on 21 March 1948 as Scenes from Twelfth Night and Macbeth.

Regional theatre

Having graduated in 1948, O'Leary's was performing at Nottingham Playhouse in 1949 in  Richard Brinsley Sheridan's The Rivals. In January 1950, O'Leary was appearing as Kate in  André van Gyseghem's The Taming of the Shrew. Extracts were broadcast on BBC Radio on 2 February 1950.	She played Thea Elvsted that same year in Ibsen's Hedda Gabler. In 1951 her plays included W. Somerset Maugham's Home and Beauty  and A Murder Has Been Arranged also at Nottingham.

In 1954 O'Leary participated in a long  repertoire of plays at the Grand Theatre, Wolverhampton: Affairs of State; The Letter; Birthday Honours; The Rivals; Friendly Relations; The Orchard Walls; The Gay Dog; Someone Waiting; Jane Steps Out; The Constant Wife; The Happy Marriage; The Trial of Mary Dugan; Are You a Mason? Meet Mr Callaghan; The Love of Four Colonels; The Bad Samaritan; Two of Everything; The Cocktail Party; and The First Year.

By 1955 O'Leary was at Gate Theatre, Dublin, performing as Frida in Luigi Pirandello's The Masquerade of Henry IV

O'Leary's performances at the Alexandra Theatre, Birmingham include the 1959 See How They Run and the 1956 Running Wild

Television
1956 saw O'Leary appear in the BBC's Story Conference beside TV debutant, Leonard Rossiter. She performed pantomime as the fairy Godmother at Alexandra Theatre in January 1956 reprising the role for the Wolverhampton Grand 1956/57 production of Cinderella.

O'Leary became best known on television for the role of Mary the anxious wife of manager, Gerry Barford (David Lodge), in the 1960s BBC soap opera, United!.

Radio
When, on 14 April 1960 the BBC broadcast John Masefield's play in verse, Good Friday:, O'Leary performed Procula, wife of Pontius Pilate (William Devlin), to the atmospheric sound effects of the BBC Radiophonic Workshop. The Home Service of Hugh Stewart's  production used soundware such as the EMS Synthi 100 and ARP Odyssey l. In 1974 Olivia Manning adapted a further two of Bennett's works (The Card and The Regent) into an eight part BBC Radio play: Denry - The Adventures Of A Card. Graham Armitage portrayed the eponymous Denry with O'Leary as the beautiful Countess of Chell.

In 1970 she played Janet Onslow in Death in the Family for the Midweek Theatre slot on BBC Radio 4. Other appearances included the BBC Radio Four adaption of Arnold Bennett's Buried Alive on 11 March 1972.

In 1972 O'Leary's character was Jane Petrie, a Borchester art teacher whose distractions while running the summer school at Arkwright Hall gets Tony Archer (Colin Skipp) the sack.

Legacy
O'Leary married doctor Donal O'Donovan. They had three children  Kate, Rosaleen and Daniel. Ursula O'Leary died unexpectedly on 17 May 1993 and her ashes were interned at Brandwood End Cemetery. Much of O'Leary's work no longer exists in the BBC archives.

References

External links

1926 births
1993 deaths
20th-century English actresses
English film actresses
English musical theatre actresses
English people of Irish descent
English radio actresses
English Shakespearean actresses
English television actresses
English voice actresses
Alumni of RADA
The Archers